General elections were held in the Cook Islands on 1 August 2022. A referendum on legalising medical cannabis was held on the same day.

Background
In the 2018 general election, the Democratic Party won a plurality with 11 seats but fell short of the 13 required to form a government. The incumbent Cook Islands Party (CIP), led by then-prime minister Henry Puna won 10 seats; the One Cook Islands Movement (OCI) secured a single seat, and independents won the remaining two. The CIP remained in government due to the support of the OCI and independents.

In October 2020, Puna resigned as prime minister to run for secretary-general of the Pacific Islands Forum. Deputy prime minister Mark Brown succeeded Puna as prime minister and leader of the Cook Islands Party. Brown appointed Robert Tapaitau deputy prime minister.

Electoral system
The 24 members of the Parliament of the Cook Islands were elected from single-member electorates by first-past-the-post voting.

Campaign
The Progressive Party of the Cook Islands was launched in October 2019 to contest the election.

The One Cook Islands Movement (OCI) announced its candidates in November 2021. However, they caused controversy by claiming Toanui Isamaela and Teina Bishop would stand as joint OCI–Democratic Party candidates; this was denied by the Democratic Party, which stated it would be announcing its own candidates and there was no alliance with the OCI.

In December 2021 the new Cook Islands United Party, founded by former Deputy Prime Minister Teariki Heather in 2018, announced eleven candidates for the elections.

Opinion polls

Preferred Prime Minister

Results
Initial projections showed the Cook Islands Party with 10 seats, the Democrats with 6, the new Cook Islands United Party with 4, and independents with 3. The seat of Ngatangiia was tied, with the CIP and United candidates on 171 votes each. The final vote count showed the CIP with 12 seats, after it won Ngatangiia and Titikaveka, where the United Party candidate originally had had a six vote lead. The Democrats won five seats, United three, the One Cook Islands Movement one and independents three.

Aftermath
The CIP began coalition talks on 4 August, and announced that it planned to continue its arrangements with two independents. The United Party ruled out working with the CIP. On 5 August the CIP announced they had secured the support of independents Te-Hani Brown and Rose Toki-Brown for a governing coalition. On 12 August Mark Brown was reappointed Prime Minister. On 25 August 2022 independent MP Stephen Matapo joined the Cook Islands Party, giving the government a total of 15 seats.

Following the election, electoral petitions were filed challenging the results in Mitiaro, Tengatangi–Areora–Ngatiarua, Teenui–Mapumai, Titikaveka and Amuri–Ureia, as well as an application for a recount in Tupapa–Maraerenga. Due to the time taken to resolve the petitions, the Cook Islands Parliament did not sit for the rest of the year, and will not sit until at least March 2023.

The final electoral petition was not resolved until 11 March 2023, when the High Court confirmed that Sonny Williams had won the seat of Titikaveka.

References

Elections in the Cook Islands
Election
Cook Islands
Cook Islands
Election and referendum articles with incomplete results